Sir Nicholas Hickman Ponsonby Bacon, 14th and 15th Baronet,  (born 17 May 1953) is a British landowner, businessman and philanthropist. Sir Nicholas is also the Premier Baronet of England.

Life and education
Bacon is the only son of Sir Edmund Bacon, KG, 13th and 14th Baronet, and Priscilla Dora Ponsonby, daughter of Colonel Sir Charles Ponsonby, 1st Baronet.

Educated at Eton College before going up to Dundee University where he graduated as MA, Bacon was then called to the Bar at Gray's Inn. Between 1966 and 1969 he served as Page of Honour to Queen Elizabeth II.

Family
Married to Susan Henrietta Dinnis in 1981, Sir Nicholas and Lady Bacon have four sons:
Henry Hickman Bacon (b. 23 April 1984)
Edmund Bacon (b. 1986)
Nathaniel Bacon (b. 1989)
Thomas Castell Bacon (b. 1992)

Bacon inherited significant landholdings in Norfolk.
Seated at the 18th century Raveningham Hall, he and his wife, Lady Bacon, share an interest in continuing the restoration of the extensive gardens, which were renovated by his late mother, Priscilla.

Appointments

Bacon was President of the Royal Horticultural Society (2013 to 2020) and a Council Member of the National Trust, and in 1998 was appointed a Deputy Lieutenant of Norfolk.

In 2005, he was appointed to the Prince's Council of the Duchy of Cornwall and served as High Sheriff of Norfolk. In 2006 he succeeded the 3rd Earl Peel, GCVO, as Lord Warden of the Stannaries and Chairman of the Prince's Council.

He is also President of the Norfolk Beekeepers Association, which is his greatest passion.

Bacon was appointed Officer of the Order of the British Empire (OBE) in the 2010 New Year Honours for services to the community in Norfolk and Knight Commander of the Royal Victorian Order (KCVO) in the 2023 New Year Honours for his services as Lord Warden of the Stannaries.

Baronetcy
Bacon inherited the Bacon baronetcy upon the death of his father in 1982.

As the Bacon baronetcy, of Redgrave in the County of Suffolk, is the oldest extant English baronetcy (created in the Baronetage of England on 22 May 1611), Sir Nicholas is considered the Premier Baronet of England.

Bacon is both the 14th and 15th holder of the Bacon baronetcies since the 8th Bacon Baronet of Mildenhall in the County of Suffolk (created in the Baronetage of England on 29 July 1627), additionally succeeded as the 7th Bacon Baronet of Redgrave in 1755 when his third cousin, the 6th Bacon Baronet of Redgrave, died without heirs.

Ancestry

References

External links
 Raveningham Gardens

1953 births
Living people
Nicholas
Pages of Honour
People educated at Eton College
Alumni of the University of Dundee
People from South Norfolk (district)
Baronets in the Baronetage of England
High Sheriffs of Norfolk
Deputy Lieutenants of Norfolk
Members of Gray's Inn
Officers of the Order of the British Empire
Knights Commander of the Royal Victorian Order